The Battle of Taierzhuang was a battle of the Second Sino-Japanese War in 1938, which was fought between the armies of the Republic of China and the Empire of Japan. The battle was that war's first major Chinese victory. It humiliated the Japanese military and its reputation as an invincible force; for the Chinese, it represented a tremendous morale boost.

Tai'erzhuang is located on the eastern bank of the Grand Canal of China and was a frontier garrison northeast of Xuzhou. It was also the terminus of a local branch railway from Lincheng. Xuzhou itself was the junction of the Jinpu railway (Tianjin-Pukou), the Longhai railway (Lanzhou-Lianyungang), and the headquarters of the KMT's 5th War Zone.

Background

Political and strategic situation 
By 1938, the Chinese military had suffered tremendous losses following the fall of Shanghai and Nanjing. In particular, its air force and navy had both been virtually wiped out. Nonetheless, China's resolve in resisting the Japanese invasion showed no signs of weakening. On 30 January, the Japanese military high command, after evaluating the situation in China, decided that no new offensive operations shall be conducted until August. Emperor Hirohito's stance was even more conservative: he believed that it would take at least a year for the Japanese to solidify their positions in their newly captured territory and consolidate their strength before conducting any further operations. Thus, the Japanese high command decided to wait until 1939 before conducting a swift, aggressive offensive in order to decisively end the war in China.

At the same time, Chiang Kai-shek refused to accept the Japanese terms for surrender. On 20 February, China withdrew its ambassador Xu Shiying  from Japan. The next day, Japan followed suit, withdrawing its ambassador Kawagoe Shigeru. Earlier that year, Chiang had also resigned from his post as Premier of the Executive Yuan, in order to fully dedicate his efforts to the war. The respective actions taken by both sides was indicative of their attitude towards the war: China was now fully committed, while Japan still showed some signs of hesitation.

Military situation 
Despite Hirohito's declaration that no new offensives would be conducted in 1938, the Japanese forces in China were eager to continue their offensive, with morale reaching a peak following the Fall of Nanjing. The IJN's preferred strategy would have been to continue advancing westwards along the Yangtze River to invade Wuhan.

However, the IJA was reluctant to continue following this approach of following waterways, and instead pursued the Chinese army retreating from the Shanghai-Nanjing theatre, driving northwards into the three provinces of Jiangsu, Shandong and Henan.

A significant proportion of the Chinese forces that withdrew from Shanghai crossed the Yangtze River northwards into the Jiangbei region. During the retreat from Nanjing, many scattered Chinese troops also found themselves drifting down the Yangtze and into Jiangbei. The IJA saw this as an opportunity to pursue and destroy this cluster of disorganized Chinese troops, thus ignoring the IJN's strategy of following the Yangtze westwards.

Throughout December 1937, Rippei Ogisu's 13th Division pursued the fleeing Chinese forces, capturing Jiangdu, Shaobo, and advancing into Anhui to capture Tianchang. Simultaneously, in Northern China, Rensuke Isogai's 10th Division, advanced southwards between Qingcheng and Jiyang to cross the Yellow River, approaching the Jiaoji railway. Gaining access to the railway would enable it to move westwards then southwards to clear the Jinpu railway and join forces with the 13th division at Xuzhou. From there, the combined Japanese forces could attack Wuhan and force the KMT into surrender. The war had thus moved from the 3rd to the 5th War Area.

Army

Chinese 
Chiang sent his Vice Chief of Staff Bai Chongxi to Xuzhou in January 1938. Li Zongren and Bai were old comrades from the New Guangxi Clique, and had served alongside each other since the Battle of Longtan in the Northern Expedition.

Chiang sent Li the 3rd War Area's 21st Army Group. Also a unit from Guangxi, the 21st was commanded by Liao Lei and consisted of the 7th and 47th Corps. At this time, Sun Zhen's 22nd Army Group, a unit from the Sichuan clique also arrived at the Shanxi-Henan region, only to be rejected by both Yan Xishan (commander of the 2nd War Area and chairman of Shanxi) and Cheng Qian (commander of the 1st War Area and chairman of Henan). Both Yan and Cheng disliked units from Sichuan for their poor discipline, particularly their rampant opium consumption.

Under the command of Sun Zhen, the 22nd Army Group had deployed four of its six divisions to assist the war effort in Northern China. Organized under the 41st and 45th corps, the contingent began its foot march towards Taiyuan on 1 September, marching for more than 50 days continuously and covering some 1400 kilometers. When they arrived in Shanxi, they were confronted with an icy winter. Despite lacking winter uniforms or even a single map of the province, they immediately engaged the Japanese for 10 days at Yangquan (阳泉), incurring heavy casualties. Desperately low on supplies, they broke into one of the Shanxi clique's supply depots, infuriating Yan Xishan, who expelled them from the province. The 22nd then withdrew westwards into the 1st War Area, only for its commander, Cheng Qian to reject its request for resupplies.

Japanese

Battle 
On 25 March, the Japanese launched an all-out attack on Tai’erzhuang, with a 300-strong contingent successfully breaching the north-eastern gate.

On 26 March, Tang Enbo cut off the Japanese attackers from the rear.

However, they were then forced into the Chenghuang temple. The Chinese then set fire to the temple, killing the entire Japanese force. The next day, the Japanese launched another assault through the breached gate and secured the eastern portion of the district, before also breaching the north-western corner from the outside and capturing the Wenchang Pavilion. 

Between March and April 1938, the Nationalist Air Force of China deployed squadrons from the 3rd and 4th Pursuit Groups of fighter-attack planes in the long-distance air-interdiction and close-air support of the Taierzhuang operations.

On 29 March, setting out from the south of the district, the assault team stormed the Wenchang pavilion from the south and east, annihilating the entire Japanese garrison with the exception of four Japanese troops taken as POWs. The Chinese had thus retaken the north-western corner of the district.

By early April, the Japanese had taken two thirds of Tai'erzhuang, although the Chinese still held the South Gate.

On 3 April, the Chinese 2nd Army Group launched a counter-offensive, with the 30th and 110th Divisions fighting northwards into Beiluo and Nigou respectively. On 6 April, the Chinese 85th and 52nd Corps linked up at Taodun, just west of Lanling. The combined force then drove north-westwards, capturing Ganlugou . With the various Chinese counter-attacks all accomplishing their objectives, the Japanese line finally collapsed, and both the 10th and 5th Divisions were forced to retreat.

However, vastly superior mobility allowed the Japanese to prevent a complete rout by the pursuing Chinese forces.

Two thousand Japanese soldiers fought their way out of Tai'erzhuang, leaving eight thousand dead; some of the soldiers who left committed hara kiri. There were more Chinese casualties, despite the lack of reliable estimate.

Reasons for the Japanese failure 
Some of the most critical reasons for the Japanese failure are as follows:
In the prelude to the battle, the Japanese were hampered by the ‘offensive defensive’ operations conducted by the various Chinese regional units, which effectively prevented the three Japanese divisions from ever achieving their objective of linking up with one another.
Despite repeatedly deploying heavy artillery, air strikes, and gas attacks, the Japanese were unable to force the Chinese 2nd Army Group from Tai’erzhuang and its surrounding regions, even as the defenders risked complete annihilation.
The Japanese failed to prevent the Chinese 20th Army Group's maneuver around their rear positions, which cut off their retreat routes and gave the Chinese the advantage of a counter-encirclement.
Following Han Fuju's insubordination and subsequent execution, the Chinese military's high command rigorously adjusted the tone at the top by clamping down on military discipline, which pervaded down throughout the ranks and resulted in even the most junior soldiers willing to risk their lives in the course of carrying out their orders. For example, a "dare to die corps" was effectively used against Japanese units. They used swords and wore suicide vests made out of grenades.
Due to lack of anti-armor weaponry, suicide bombing was also used against the Japanese. Chinese troops strapped explosives like grenade packs or dynamite to their bodies and threw themselves under Japanese tanks to blow them up. Dynamite and grenades were strapped on by Chinese troops who rushed at Japanese tanks and blew themselves up. During one incident at Tai’erzhuang, Chinese suicide bombers obliterated four Japanese tanks with grenade bundles.

Aftermath
The defeat was a significant blow to the Japanese military. It was the first major Japanese defeat since the beginning of the war, broke the myth of Imperial Japanese military invincibility, and resulted in an incalculable benefit to Chinese morale. Amid the celebrations of the victory in Hankou and other Chinese cities, Japan initially denied its defeat and ridiculed the reports of the battle for days. It was reported on by the New York Times.

The battle also resulted in significant casualties and losses for the Japanese, who claimed to have suffered a total of 11,918 casualties. The Chinese claimed to have annihilated 24,000 Japanese troops in addition to shooting down 3 aircraft and destroying or capturing approximately 30 tanks and more than 10 other armoured vehicles.

References 

Sources

 Cheung, Raymond. OSPREY AIRCRAFT OF THE ACES 126: Aces of the Republic of China Air Force. Oxford: Bloomsbury Publishing Plc, 2015. .
 Hsu Long-hsuen and Chang Ming-kai, History of The Sino-Japanese War (1937-1945) 2nd Ed., 1971. Translated by Wen Ha-hsiung, Chung Wu Publishing; 33, 140th Lane, Tung-hwa Street, Taipei, Taiwan Republic of China. Pg. 221–230. Map. 9-1
 Xú,Lùméi. Fallen: A Decryption of 682 Air Force Heroes of The War of Resistance-WWII and Their Martyrdom. 东城区, 北京， 中国: 团结出版社, 2016. .

External links 
 

Tai'erzhuang
Taierzhuang
1938 in China
1938 in Japan
Taierzhuang
March 1938 events
April 1938 events
Major National Historical and Cultural Sites in Shandong